The Basketligan Basketball All-Star Game was an annual basketball event in Sweden, organised by the SBL. The All-Star Game or Weekend includes a match between a selection of the league's all-stars, a slam-dunk and a three-point contest. The league was originally established in 1992. The event did not continue after 2008, but it was re-established in 2011 for just one edition, adding in the skills contest. The 2011 was the most recent edition.

List of games
Bold: Team that won the game.

Three-Point Shoot Contest

Slam-Dunk Contest

Skills Contest

Rosters

2005 All-Star Game
North - South 96-94 

NORTH (Christer Stjernborg from Sundsvall Dragons): Andrew Pleick, Fred Drains, Joakim Kjellbom, Kenny Walker - James JJ Miller, Andrew Mitchell, Jim Nystrom, Cedric Taylor, Mike Palm. 
SOUTH (Torbjorn Gehrke from Sodertalje Kings): Jens Stalhandske, Charles Thomas, Andrew Drevo, Nick Eppeheimer, Johan Akesson - Tezale Archie, Mikael Lindqvist, Steve Pettyjohn, Serdar Akyuz*, Jason Andreas*.*Jason Andreas and Serdar Akyuz replaced injured Damen Maddox and starter David Bergstrom respectively.

2006 All-Star Game
Team Europe - Team USA 112-114 (Quarters: 22-37, 28-29, 35-22, 27-26)
Europe: Andrew Pleick 23, Fred Drains 16, John P Rosendahl 14, Mikael Lindqvist 12, Michael Palm 11, Stefan Grundstrom 11, David Bergstrom 6, Lesli Myrthil 7, Jens Tillman 5, * 5.
USA: Derrick Tarver 41, Charles Thomas 25, Zach Williams 15, Quinnel Brown 12, Emmanuel Dies 6, Orlando Lightfoot 5, James Williams 4, Whitney Robinson 4, RT Guinn 2, Tommy Adams (did not play).*Michael Bree did not play due to injury, replaced by Hakan Larsson.

2007 All-Star Game
Team Sweden - Team World 
Sweden (David Visscher & Matthias Kentta, Jens Stalhandske): Joakim Kjellbom, John Rosendahl, Fred Drains, Mike Palm, Jonathan Skjoldebrand, Mikael Lindqvist, Joakim Blom, Adnan Chuk, Lesli Myrthil.
World (Peter Oqvist & Pontus Frivold, Dennis Cooper): Andrew Mitchell, Jerome Coleman (185-G-81, Boakai Lalugba, Lorenzo Gordon, Tim Whitworth, Howard Frier, Emmanuel Dies, Anthony Johnson, Thomas Jackson, Jeffrey Viggiano.

2008 All-Star Game
Stockholm 2008: Team Sweden - Team World 101-105  
Team Sweden (Jonte Karlsson from 08 Stockholm): Jonathan Skjoldebrandt 32, Joakim Blom 15, Joakim Kjellbom 14, Lesli Myrthil 8, Fredrik Jonzen 8, Jim Nystrom 7, John Rosendahl 6,  5, Fred Drains 4, Adam Alexander 2, Rudy Mbemba.
Team World (Pekka Salminen from Solna): Alex Wesby 22, Herman Favors 16, Tim Whitworth 15, Brandon McKnight 13, Jeremiah Johnson 12, Dee Ayuba 12, Bilal Salaam 7, Gerald Riley 4, Ian Johnson 2, Michael Kingma 2, Ryan McDade.

2011 All-Star Weekend
20-21 February 2011, Sporthallen, (att: 2,174): North–South 117–128 (Quarters: 27–30, 23–34, 39–22, 28–42) 
NORTH: Liam Rush 24, Drazen Klaric 19, Jakob Sigurdarson 14, Alex Wesby 13, Rudy Mbemba 13, Bilal Saalam 10, Hlynur Baeringsson 8, Tim Withworth 7, Benjamin Smith 5, Tim Kearny 4.
SOUTH: Johnell Smith 25, William Walker 25, Dino Pita 25, Logi Gunnarsson 15, Demetrius Brown 11, Kellen McCoy 9, Willy Beck 7, Christopher Ryan 7, Jesper Andersson 4.

Players with most appearances (2004-2011)

References

Basketball all-star games
Basketball in Sweden